This is a list of the largest urban agglomerations in North America.  It includes the 50 most populated urban agglomerations.

See also 
 List of North American metropolitan areas by population
 List of the largest metropolitan areas in the Americas
 List of North American cities by population
 World's largest urban agglomerations

References 

North America
Largest urban agglomerations
Urban agglomerationsist
02
.
Demographics of Mexico